Bradshaw Mountain High School is a grade 9–12 school located in Prescott Valley, Arizona operated by the Humboldt Unified School District.

Humboldt USD includes most of Prescott Valley, all of Dewey Humboldt, small portions of Chino Valley and Mayer.

History

Notable alumni
 Dusty Brown, former MLB player (Boston Red Sox, Pittsburgh Pirates)
 Ben Diggins, former MLB player (Milwaukee Brewers)

References

External links
 School website
 Arizona Department of Education – Bradshaw Mountain High School

Prescott Valley, Arizona
Public high schools in Arizona
Schools in Yavapai County, Arizona
Educational institutions established in 1985
1985 establishments in Arizona